The Berlin Demography Forum (BDF) is a global, non-partisan platform providing a new impetus to raise awareness of the significance of demographic change both at a national and international level. The forum brings together high-ranking politicians, scientists, business leaders, and representatives of international organisations and civil society to debate potential solutions and to contribute to sustainable development.

Conferences 

Conference themes were: “Family – Children – Society” at the BDF 2012, “Generations – Learning – Prosperity“ at the BDF 2013, “Trust – Security – Solidarity” at the BDF 2014 and "Activity –  Health –  Participation" in 2015. The fifth BDF took place on February 24–25, 2016 on the topics of „Labour – Perspectives – Prosperity“. The sixth BDF is going to take place on February 15–16, 2017 in Berlin.

Organization 

The  BDF is a cooperation between the German Federal Ministry of Family Affairs, Senior Citizens, Women and Youth and Allianz SE. In addition, the German Federal Ministries of the Interior and  Health contribute to this Forum. The European School of Management and Technology (ESMT) is the host and partner of the BDF. Vodafone Foundation Germany supports the Forum by sponsoring the Young Expert Panels. Wolfgang Ischinger and Jörg Rocholl (ESMT) are the patrons of this event.

The BDF is supported by an advisory council. In March 2014, Franz Müntefering replaced Ursula Lehr as chairman.

Participants 

Each year, 300 decision-makers participate in the Berlin Demography Forum. Some of those high-ranking participants include:

 Alain Berset
 Dominique Bertinotti
 Francesco Billari
 Carol M. Black
 M. Michele Burns
 Michèle Delaunay
 Michael Diekmann
 Markus Dröge
 Elsa Fornero
 Hermann Gröhe
 Yves Leterme
 Thomas de Maizière
 Åsa Regnér
 Bert Rürup
 Kristina Schröder
 Ursula Staudinger
 Rita Süssmuth
 Sven Voelpel

References

External links 
 Bundesfamilienministerium: Demografischer Wandel
 Website of the Berlin Demography Forum
 ESMT European School of Management and Technology
 Vodafone Foundation

Sources 

 

Events in Berlin
Demography
Non-profit organisations based in Berlin